Bruce Weber (born March 29, 1946) is an American fashion photographer and occasional filmmaker. He has made ad campaigns for Calvin Klein, Ralph Lauren, Pirelli, Abercrombie & Fitch, Revlon, and Gianni Versace, and made work for Vogue, GQ, Vanity Fair, Elle, Life, Interview, and Rolling Stone magazines.

Life and work
Weber was born in Greensburg, Pennsylvania, to a Jewish family. His fashion photography first appeared in the late 1970s in GQ magazine, where he had frequent cover photos. Nan Bush, his longtime companion and agent, was able to secure a contract with Federated Department Stores to shoot the 1978 Bloomingdales mail catalog. He came to the attention of the general public in the late 1980s and early 1990s with his advertising images for Calvin Klein. He was first approached by Klein to work on an underwear campaign, and Weber took inspiration from Herbert List's shoot in Santorini. His straightforward black-and-white shots, featuring an unclothed woman and man on a swing facing each other, two clothed men in bed, and model Marcus Schenkenberg barely holding jeans in front of himself in a shower, catapulted them both into the national spotlight. His photograph for Calvin Klein of Olympic athlete Tom Hintnaus in white briefs is an iconic image. He photographed the winter 2006 Ralph Lauren Collection.

Some of Weber's other earliest fashion photography appeared in the SoHo Weekly News and featured a spread of men wearing only their underwear. The photos became the center of controversy and Weber was told by some that he would never find work as a fashion photographer again. This reputation stuck with him, as he says: "I don't really work editorially in a large number of magazines because a lot of magazines don't want my kind of photographs. It's too risky for them".

After doing photo shoots for and of famous people (many of whom were featured in Andy Warhol's Interview magazine), Weber made short films of teenage boxers (Broken Noses), his beloved pet dogs, and later, a longer film entitled Chop Suey. He directed Let's Get Lost, a 1988 documentary about jazz trumpeter Chet Baker.

Weber's photographs are occasionally in color; however, most are in black and white or toned shades. They are gathered in books, including A House is Not a Home as well as Bear Pond and Gentle Giants, two books of his photographs of his pet dogs.

Weber began collaborating with crooner Chris Isaak in the mid-1980s, photographing Isaak in 1986 for his second album, Chris Isaak. In 1988, Weber photographed a shirtless Isaak in bed for a fashion spread in Rolling Stone. Isaak appeared in Let's Get Lost and Weber has directed a music video for Isaak.

Weber photographed Harry Connick, Jr. for his 1991 album Blue Light, Red Light.

In 1993, Weber photographed singer-songwriter Jackson Browne for his 1993 album I'm Alive.

Filmmaking

Weber's cinematic works—including his four feature-length films—often begin with a photo sitting. While he was photographing the Olympic hopefuls for Interview Magazine in 1984, Weber met Andy Minsker, a young boxer from Oregon, and started interviewing him on camera. While he originally intended to make a short to accompany an exhibition he was opening in Paris, Weber became very excited when he reviewed the dailies and decided to continue the story. Broken Noses (1987), the resulting feature documentary, was nominated for the Grand Jury Award at Sundance in 1988.

As Weber was completing work on Broken Noses, he met the jazz trumpeter and vocalist Chet Baker and began filming him, again with a mind to creating a short film based on their portrait sitting. But filming with Baker continued right through the presentation of Broken Noses in Cannes that year—with Weber ultimately assembling the footage of travel, recording sessions, and interviews into his second feature, Let's Get Lost (1988). The film debuted in Venice (where it won the Cinecritica award) and was subsequently nominated for a Grand Jury Award at Sundance, and for an Oscar for Best Documentary Feature.

Chop Suey, a kaleidoscopic portrait of the wrestler Peter Johnson, was released in 2001, and the impressionistic anti-war film A Letter to True in 2004. His work-in-progress Robert Mitchum feature, Nice Girls Don't Stay for Breakfast was screened at the New York Film Festival in 2017. He has also directed seven short films: Beauty Brothers, Parts I-IV (1987), Backyard Movie (1991), Gentle Giants (1994), The Teddy Boys of the Edwardian Drape Society (1995), Wine and Cupcakes (2007), The Boy Artist (2008), and Liberty City is Like Paris to Me (2009).

Sexual assault allegations 
In December 2017, model Jason Boyce sued Weber in New York State Supreme Court, claiming  sexual assault, including inappropriate touching and kissing during a 2014 casting session. The suit also targets Jason Kanner of Soul Artist Management, which managed Boyce when the alleged assault took place, and Little Bear Inc., the production company operated by Weber's companion, Nan Bush. A second model, Mark Ricketson, came forward in December 2017 alleging similar claims and joined Boyce's lawsuit against Weber.

Weber has denied the allegations, stating to The New York Times that the allegations were "untrue" and that he had "never touched anyone inappropriately".

In January 2018, The New York Times detailed sexual assault allegations by 15 male models against Weber.

In January 2019, it was reported that Weber asked to dismiss the original suit by Jason Boyce, with evidence provided that the model sent him racy photos and texts prior to and after the shoots. The judge refused dismissal and as of September 30, 2020, the case continued.

Personal life 

Weber has been living since the early 1970s with his girlfriend, Nan Bush, who is also his agent and one of his closest collaborators. 

He has stated, in a 2002 interview : "I've had a lot of great romances. Men and women, I mean I feel like I can fall in love almost every day. I feel sorry for people who don't feel that."

He has lived in Miami since 1998.

Films

Music videos

In 1990, Weber directed the music video for the Pet Shop Boys single "Being Boring". He filmed a party with a diverse group of models. The video was filmed in one day by two film crews in a house on Long Island. Content including male and female nudity prevented the video from being played on MTV in the United States. In 1996 he directed the video for the Pet Shop Boys single "Se a vida é (That's the Way Life Is)" on location in a Wet 'n' Wild, a water park near Orlando, Florida. In 2002, he again directed a Pet Shop Boys video, for the song "I Get Along" from the album Release. Weber filmed this video on location at his own Little Bear studio in New York City. He also directed the music video for the Chris Isaak song "Blue Spanish Sky".

Awards and nominations

Bibliography

Books and monographs

Museums and Libraries

In addition to monographs and exhibition catalogs, he and Nan have published an independent arts journal titled All-American for the past seventeen years. During that time, All-American has evolved as a celebration of work by artists, photographers, essayists, poets and personalities of note. Sometimes the subjects of the journal are already well known in their own right, but just as often, the participants and subjects of All-American are noteworthy not for their fame, but because their stories or accomplishments reveal something Weber believes will resonate with readers on a deeper, more personal level. His continued dedication to the All-American project is motivated equally by a desire to connect, to inspire, and to support the work of emerging artists.

Weber has continued to exhibit his work in prominent museums around the world, often working closely with the curator and art director Dimitri Levas to realize his vision. Weber's most recent solo shows include "Far From Home" at Dallas Contemporary (2016), "Detroit: Bruce Weber" at the Detroit Institute of Arts (2012), and "Haiti/Little Haiti" (2010) at the Museum of Contemporary Art in North Miami.

Other books

 Rolling Stone: The Photographs, Simon & Schuster Editions (1989), pp. ??-??
 Pictures Of Peace, Alfred A. Knopf (1991), pp. ??-??
 Bruce Hainley and David Rimanelli, Shock of the Newfoundland: Bruce Weber's canine camera, "Artforum International 33" (April 1995), pp. 78–81.
 Il Tempo E La Moda, Skira; Exhibition Catalogue: "Biennale Firenze" (1996), pp. ??-??
 Gianni Versace, Rock and Royalty, Abbeville Press (Febbraio 1997), pp. ??-??
 David Leddick, The Male Nude, New York: Taschen (1998), pp. ??-??
 Pirelli Calendar 1964–2004, Rizzoli (2004), pp. ??-??
 Heel To Heal (2004), pp. ??-??
 Paintings of New York, 1800–1950 (2005), pp. ??-??
 Monica Bellucci, Rizzoli (2010), pp. ??-??
 Kate Moss, Rizzoli (2012), pp. ??-??

References

External links
 
 

1946 births
Living people
Fashion photographers
American erotic photographers
People from Greensburg, Pennsylvania
Abercrombie & Fitch
20th-century American photographers
21st-century American photographers
American documentary film directors
American people of Jewish descent
American music video directors
American LGBT photographers
LGBT people from Pennsylvania
LGBT people from Florida
Film directors from Pennsylvania
21st-century American LGBT people
Bisexual photographers